Sarasiab (also Romanized as Sarāsīāb) is a village in Miyan Darband Rural District, in the Central District of Kermanshah County, Kermanshah Province, Iran. At the 2006 census, its population was 134, in 27 families.

References 

Populated places in Kermanshah County